Stephen Guy Peall (born 2 September 1969) is a former Zimbabwean cricketer who played in four Test matches and 21 One Day Internationals between 1992 and 1996.

References

1969 births
Living people
Cricketers from Harare
White Zimbabwean sportspeople
Alumni of Falcon College
Zimbabwe Test cricketers
Zimbabwe One Day International cricketers
Zimbabwean cricketers
Cricketers at the 1996 Cricket World Cup